Ian Boswell (born February 7, 1991) is an American off-road cyclist, who competes in gravel bike racing for the Wahoo Frontiers team.

Career
Born in Bend, Oregon, United States, where he competed in a number of sports including high school basketball, American football, cross-country skiing and running, Boswell currently resides in Peacham, Vermont.

He was named in the start list for the 2015 Vuelta a España and the 2016 Giro d'Italia. In July 2018, he was named in the start list for the 2018 Tour de France.

He won the Unbound Gravel 200 in 2021, pipping another former WorldTour pro Laurens ten Dam to the finish.

Major results

2006
 3rd Road race, National Youth Road Championships
2008
 2nd Time trial, National Junior Road Championships
 4th Overall Tour de l'Abitibi
2010
 1st Nevada City Classic
 3rd Overall Tour of Utah
1st  Young rider classification
2011
 1st Nevada City Classic
 5th Overall Cascade Cycling Classic
2012
 1st Stage 5 Tour of the Gila
 2nd Liège–Bastogne–Liège Espoirs
 5th Overall Tour of Utah
 5th Overall Tour de l'Avenir
 5th Gran Premio Palio del Recioto
 6th Trofeo Alcide Degasperi
2014
 9th Overall Route du Sud
2015
 7th Overall Tour of California
 9th Trofeo Andratx–Mirador d'Es Colomer
 10th Overall Tour de Langkawi
2016
 1st Stage 1 (TTT) Vuelta a España
2017
 5th Overall Tour of California
 6th Overall Settimana Internazionale di Coppi e Bartali
 8th Trofeo Pollenca–Port de Andratx
2021
 1st Unbound Gravel 200
2022
 3rd Unbound Gravel 200

Grand Tour general classification results timeline

References

External links

 
 
 
 

1991 births
Living people
American male cyclists
Cyclists from Oregon
Sportspeople from Bend, Oregon